Maricopa can refer to:

Places
 Maricopa, Arizona, United States, a city in Maricopa County
 Maricopa Freeway, a section of I-10 in Metropolitan Phoenix
 Maricopa station, an Amtrak station in Maricopa, Arizona
 Maricopa County, Arizona, United States
 Maricopa, California, United States, a rural town

Other uses
 Maricopa people, a Native American ethnic group
 Maricopa language, spoken by the Maricopa
 Maricopa (moth), a genus of insects

Language and nationality disambiguation pages